The Nokia 3210 is a GSM cellular phone, announced by Nokia on 18 March 1999.

Design 

The 3210 was designed by Alastair Curtis in Nokia's Los Angeles Design Center. The development was led by Frank Nuovo, who had designed the sleek and curvy Nokia 8110 in 1996. The team wanted to create an "expressive" and personalisable handset beyond the usual business-oriented mobile phone market, inspired by the Casio G-Shock and Sony Walkman designs. The phone thus became highly influential.

Notable features 

The Nokia 3210 has a total weight of 151 g. The handset measures 123.8 × 50.5 × 22.5 mm and features customisable fascias which clip on. It was thinner than previous Nokia models.

It was the first mass market phone with an internal antenna, after the feature had been introduced by Nokia on the luxury phone Nokia 8810 in 1998. Reception, although poorer than that of its predecessor, the 3110, was still very good.

Three games came preinstalled: Snake, Memory (pairs-memory game) and Rotation. The addition of such games encouraged high sales within a youth market which was enlarging at a very fast rate. Some versions of the 3210 included the "hidden" games React and Logic. They were activated by special software using a data cable.

The 3210 was the first device that came preloaded with Nokia's Composer software, which allowed users to manually 'compose' monotone ringtones. It was possible to send the ringtones to another Nokia phone.

Picture messages sent via the SMS texting service were implemented in the handset, allowing users to send preinstalled pictures to one another. These included a "Happy Birthday" picture amongst others.

The handset was competitively priced and aimed specifically at teenagers and young professionals. This was at a time when few young people had access to a mobile phone, being generally identified with older professionals and business people.

The 3210 was originally designed with a vibrate alert function. Nokia decided not to implement this feature on some handsets within certain jurisdictions. A few months after its UK release, some mobile phone repair shops offered customers a handset upgrade to the vibrate function for a small fee.

Handset specifications 

 Standby time (h): 55–260
 Talk time (min): 180–270
 Charge time (h): 4
 Ringtone composer
 Dual band: yes
 Vibrating alert (optional)
 Speed dialing
 3 games
 Internal antenna
 Green backlight
 Interchangeable fascias

Reception 

A combination of cutting-edge features such as internal antennas and T9 text entry ensured the 3210 huge commercial success. Much of the phone's success can also be attributed to an advertising campaign aimed predominantly at young people, a first in the mobile phone industry. The inclusion of 3 games, changeable "Xpress-on" covers (as on the previous Nokia 5110), an internal antenna, customisable ringtones and competitive prices led to the handset's huge popularity with those aged 15–25.

With 160 million units sold, the 3210 is one of the most popular and successful phones in history. It is considered one of the most significant handsets Nokia ever developed.

See also 

 Nokia 3110
 Nokia 3310

References 

3210
Mobile phones introduced in 1999
Mobile phones with user-replaceable battery